Velayat Rud (also Romanized as Velāyat Rūd; also known as Valātrūd) is a village in Nesa Rural District, Asara District, Karaj County, Alborz Province, Iran. At the 2006 census, its population was 1,649 in 454 households. At the most recent census in 2016, the population had decreased to 1,382 people in 458 households; it was the largest village in its rural district.

References 

Karaj County

Populated places in Alborz Province

Populated places in Karaj County